Olga Semenova (ne Olga Tchoukina) is a Paralympian athlete from Russia competing mainly in category P13 sprint events. She formerly competed in P11 pentathlon events.

Career 
Olga competed in the pentathlon at the 1996 Summer Paralympics winning the silver medal behind American Marla Runyan who set a new world record to win. She competed in the 2000 Summer Paralympics in Sydney, Australia.  There she won a gold medal in the women's Pentathlon - P13 event.  She also competed at the 2004 Summer Paralympics in Athens, Greece.    There she won a gold medal in the women's 100 metres - T13 event and a gold medal in the women's 400 metres - T13 event.  She also competed at the 2008 Summer Paralympics in Beijing, China.  There she did not finish in  the women's 100 metres - T13 event and went out in the first round of the women's 400 metres - T13 event

References

External links 
 

Year of birth missing (living people)
Living people
Paralympic athletes of Russia
Athletes (track and field) at the 1996 Summer Paralympics
Athletes (track and field) at the 2000 Summer Paralympics
Athletes (track and field) at the 2004 Summer Paralympics
Athletes (track and field) at the 2008 Summer Paralympics
Paralympic silver medalists for Russia
Paralympic gold medalists for Russia
Medalists at the 1996 Summer Paralympics
Medalists at the 2000 Summer Paralympics
Medalists at the 2004 Summer Paralympics
Paralympic medalists in athletics (track and field)
Russian female sprinters
Russian pentathletes
Visually impaired sprinters
Paralympic sprinters
21st-century Russian women